The Wyoming County Courthouse and Jail is a historic courthouse and jail located in Pineville, Wyoming County, West Virginia.  It consists of the unusually large neoclassical courthouse, with a massive pediment, and an adjoining stone jail.  The courthouse was designed by West Virginia state architect A. F. Wysong and built in 1916 of locally quarried stone.  The jail was built of similar materials in 1930 with Work Projects Administration labor.  A statue of preacher W.H.H. Cook, an early settler of the area and influential citizen, stands in front of the courthouse.

The Wyoming County Courthouse was placed in the National Register of Historic Places in 1979.

References

Buildings and structures in Wyoming County, West Virginia
Neoclassical architecture in West Virginia
County courthouses in West Virginia
Courthouses on the National Register of Historic Places in West Virginia
Government buildings completed in 1916
Works Progress Administration in West Virginia
National Register of Historic Places in Wyoming County, West Virginia
Clock towers in West Virginia